The 5th street bridge, also known as the Arthur J. DiTommaso Memorial Bridge, is a cable stayed bridge in Fitchburg, Massachusetts. It crosses the North Nashua River and the Fitchburg Line of the MBTA Commuter Rail.

See also 
 North Nashua River
 Fitchburg Line

References

External links 
 5th Street Bridge

Cable-stayed bridges in the United States
Buildings and structures in Fitchburg, Massachusetts